Oncidium gardneri is a species of orchid native to southern and southeastern Brazil.

Synonyms
Oncidium curtum Lindl.
Oncidium flabelliferum Pinel
Oncidium elegantissimum Rchb.f.
Oncidium gardnerianum auct.
Oncidium praestans Rchb.f.
Oncidium brunnipetalum Barb.Rodr.
Oncidium caloglossum Rchb.f.
Oncidium pollettianum Rchb.f.
Oncidium larkinianum Gower
Oncidium wheatleyanum Gower
Oncidium gardneri var. elegantissimum (Rchb.f.) Cogn.
Oncidium gardneri var. pollettianum (Rchb.f.) Cogn.
Oncidium gardneri var. praestans (Rchb.f.) Cogn.
Oncidium pectorale var. caloglossum (Rchb.f.) Cogn.
Oncidium pectorale var. larkinianum (Gower) Cogn.
Oncidium gardneri subsp. caloglossum (Rchb.f.) Fowlie
Ampliglossum brunnipetalum (Barb.Rodr.) Campacci
Brasilidium curtum (Lindl.) Campacci, Colet.
Brasilidium gardneri (Lindl.) Campacci, Colet.
Coppensia brunnipetala (Barb.Rodr.) Campacci

gardneri